The I&M Bank Tower is a skyscraper in Nairobi, Kenya's capital and largest city. It was designed and constructed by Laxmanbhai Construction LTD and designed by Planning Systems Services Ltd.

Location
The building is located on Kenyatta Avenue, in Nairobi's central business district, adjacent to the Kenyan headquarters of CFC Stanbic Bank. The coordinates of the building are:1°17'05.0"S, 36°49'12.0"E (Latitude:-1.284714; Longitude:36.819993).

Overview
Completed in 2001, the tower is the main headquarters for I&M Bank Limited (I&M Bank), the lynchpin of the I&M Bank Group. In the past, the building also served as the headquarters of the Standard Group, which includes The Standard newspaper and Kenya Television Network station.

See also
 I&M Bank Group
 List of banks in Kenya
 List of tallest buildings in Nairobi
 Nairobi
 Economy of Kenya
 Government Structure of Kenya

References

External links
 Website of I&M Bank

Office buildings completed in 2001
Buildings and structures in Nairobi
Skyscraper office buildings in Kenya
2001 establishments in Kenya